Travis Gordon Lopes Jr. (born December 12, 1991) is an American professional wrestler currently wrestling under the name Flip Gordon.

Professional wrestling career

Early career
Gordon trained under Brian Fury and the New England Pro Wrestling Academy. He made his singles debut against Biff Busick on May 6, 2015.

Independent circuit (2016–2017)
He appeared for Chaotic Wrestling, where he won his first title during A Night Of Grand Slams on September 9, 2016, in a Six-Way Scramble match to gain the CW New England Championship. He lost his title on February 3, 2017 against Mike Verna. In 2016, Gordon debuted for Combat Zone Wrestling defeating Chuck Taylor, Steve Scott and Dan Barry.

Ring of Honor (2017–2021) 
Gordon signed a contract with Ring of Honor a month after his first match on the promotion, where he lost to Matt Sydal on April 8, 2017, in Baltimore, Maryland. On December 15, 2017, at ROH's Final Battle Gordon teamed with Dragon Lee and Titan against The Young Bucks and Hangman Page for the ROH World 6-Man Tag Titles, but they were unsuccessful.
On July 20, 2018, at ROH's Honor for All event, Nick Aldis defeated Gordon by submission to retain the NWA World Heavyweight Championship. After the match, Cody Rhodes helped Gordon to his feet and teased booking him for the All In event before Bully Ray assaulted Gordon with a low blow. On September 1, 2018, Gordon won the All In Over the Budget Battle Royal for the chance to challenge Jay Lethal for the ROH World Championship the same night, which he did unsuccessfully. In the Sea At Honor Tournament, Gordon defeated Jay Briscoe in the finals to win the tournament giving him a future ROH World Championship shot. At 2019's ROH Honor Reigns Supreme, Gordon was in a match against Tracy Williams; early in the match Gordon injured his knee bringing the match to a premature end.

In June 2019, at Best in the World, Gordon was revealed as the fourth member of Villain Enterprises by leader Marty Scurll after Villain Enterprises retained their ROH World Six-Man Tag Team Championship against Lifeblood. Gordon, alongside Scurll and fellow members Brody King and PCO, would attack Lifeblood, turning Gordon heel for the first time in his ROH career. It was announced in May 2020, that Gordon has signed a brand new multi-year deal with Ring of Honor.

Consejo Mundial de Lucha Libre (2017–2018) 
On September 16, 2017, Gordon made his debut with Consejo Mundial de Lucha Libre, teaming with Volador Jr. and Carístico to defeat Kojima, Mephisto, and Último Guerrero at the CMLL 84th Anniversary Show. He also wrestled several events during the week such as Puebla shows and Tuesday, Friday, and Sunday Arena México shows. Gordon would come back for CMLL's Gran Prix Internacional – Torneo Cibernético where his team would win.

New Japan Pro-Wrestling (2018) 
In February 2018, Gordon wrestled for the Ring of Honor's and New Japan Pro-Wrestling's cross-promotional event, Honor Rising, where he would win a three-way match against Hiromu Takahashi & Kushida on Night One. He would lose a tag team match on Night Two, teaming with Ryusuke Taguchi against Los Ingobernables de Japon (Bushi & Hiromu Takahashi). In May 2018, Gordon was announced as one of the 16 participants in New Japan's annual Best of the Super Juniors tournament. He finished the tournament with three wins and four losses, failing to advance to the finals. After competing at the jointly promoted G1 Supercard, Gordon was announced as returning to the Best of the Super Juniors tournament. He would ultimately be unable to compete in the tournament due to visa issues.

Personal life 
Lopes previously served six years as a member of the Army National Guard, working as a combat engineer with specialization in explosives training. After completing his enlistment, Lopes was honorably discharged on May 1, 2018.

Championships and accomplishments
Chaotic Wrestling
 Chaotic Wrestling New England Championship (1 time)
Fight Forever Wrestling                                                             
 Fight Forever Men's World Championship (1 time)
MCW Pro Wrestling
Shane Shamrock Cup (2022)
Northeast Wrestling
NEW Heavyweight Championship (1 time)
 King of Bethany Tournament (2016)
LDN Wrestling
 LDN British Heavyweight Championship (1 time) 
 LDN World Championship (1 time)
North Shore Pro Wrestliing
 NSPW Maritime Championship (1 time)
 Pro Wrestling Illustrated
 Ranked No. 114 of the top 500 singles wrestlers in the PWI 500 in 2019
 Ring of Honor
 Sea of Honor Tournament (2018)
 ROH Year-End Award (2 times)
 Breakout Star of the Year (2018)
 Faction of the Year (2019) – with Villain Enterprises
 World Series Wrestling
 WSW Tag Team Championship (1 time, current)  with Brian Cage
 Xtreme Wrestling Alliance
 XWA Firebrand Championship (1 time)

References

External links
 

1991 births
Living people
Sportspeople from Weymouth, Massachusetts
American male professional wrestlers
National Guard (United States) officers
Professional wrestlers from Massachusetts
Villain Enterprises members